Onychocerus albitarsis is a relatively rare species of beetle in the family Cerambycidae from the Amazon and Atlantic forest regions in Brazil, Bolivia, Paraguay and southern Peru. It is remarkable for being the only known beetle that has a venomous sting (as opposed to spraying toxins like bombardier beetles or secreting toxins from the body like blister beetles) and the only known arthropod that stings with its antennae. Each antenna ends in a stinger that has evolved to resemble a scorpion's tail and it is connected to a venom gland. The sting was already reported in 1884 but researchers thought the pain only was caused by the sharpness of the antennae, as also known from some other beetles. It was only confirmed in 2005 that it is venomous when a biologist was stung, comparing it to a bee sting, and subsequently studied it in detail. In the first of two other cases where the identity of the stinging insect was confirmed to be this beetle, a woman experienced significant pain directly after the incident, and redness and itching at the sting site that lasted for a week. In the other case a man experienced moderate pain directly after being stung and redness that only lasted for an hour. The other species in the genus Onychocerus appear to not be venomous since they lack the structures inside the antennae that are associated with the venom apparatus of Onychocerus albitarsis.

Little is known about its behavior, but it is phytophagous.

References

Anisocerini
Beetles described in 1859
Taxa named by Francis Polkinghorne Pascoe